is a Japanese professional shogi player ranked 4-dan.

Early life
Mikio Kariyama was born in Kurashiki on November 12, 2001. He learned how to play shogi from his father, and was accepted into the Japan Shogi Association's (JSA) apprentice school at the rank of 6-kyū under the tutelage of shogi professional Keita Inoue in September 2014.

Kariyama was promoted to the rank of apprentice professional 3-dan in 2019. He obtained full professional status and the corresponding rank of 4-dan in September 2021 after tying for first with Tomoki Yokoyama in the 69th 3-dan League (April 2021September 2021) with a record of 13 wins and 5 losses.

Promotion history
The promotion history for Kariyama is as follows.

 6-kyū: September 1, 2014
 3-dan: October 2019
 4-dan: October 1, 2021

References

External links
 ShogiHub: Professional Player Info · Mikio Kariyama

Living people
2001 births
Japanese shogi players
Professional shogi players
People from Kurashiki
Professional shogi players from Okayama Prefecture